Anthony Mundine Jr. (born 21 May 1975) is an Australian former professional boxer and rugby league footballer. In boxing he competed from 2000 to 2021, and held the WBA super-middleweight title twice between 2003 and 2008. He also held the IBO middleweight title from 2009 to 2010, and the WBA interim super-welterweight title from 2011 to 2012. Mundine is well known for his heated rivalries with fellow Australians Danny Green and Daniel Geale.

Before his move to boxing, Mundine was the highest-paid player in the National Rugby League (NRL). He considers himself to be Australia's best all-round athlete.

Mundine was named the Aboriginal and Torres Strait Islander Person of the Year in 2000. He is the first boxer in history to have had every one of his professional fights broadcast for television and has generated more pay-per-views than any other Australian boxer since he turned professional. Steve Bunce has described him as "arguably the greatest crossover athlete in boxing history". Mundine has had a stormy relationship with the media: his conversion to Islam in 1999, self-promotion and outspoken opinions have created a love–hate relationship with the Australian public. Mundine has been described as "the most polarising athlete in Australian sports history".

Early life and education
He is the son of former professional boxer Tony Mundine and hails from the Bundjalung people of northern coastal areas of New South Wales. Mundine was born in Newtown, in the inner west of Sydney in 1975. Both of his parents are Aboriginal. Mundine was raised as a Christian but converted to Islam in the late 1990s.

Mundine played junior rugby league for Hurstville United and, while attending Kingsgrove High School, Mundine starred for the school in the 1993 and 1994 teams which won the University Shield both of those years. He also played for the Australian Schoolboys team in 1993. That year, Mundine signed with the St. George Dragons as an eighteen-year-old. Mundine also attended Canterbury Boys' High School and Cleveland Street High School.

Rugby league 

In 1994, Mundine represented the Junior Kangaroos, the team that beat Great Britain's under-19s in the curtain-raiser to the Australia v. France Test at Parramatta Stadium.

In 1996, he played in a losing grand final, against the Manly-Warringah Sea Eagles. That year, he was the victim of racial vilification when Rugby League player Barry Ward called Mundine a "black cunt". Ward was fined $10,000 for the offence. At the end of that season Mundine announced that he was signing with the Brisbane Broncos in the Super League competition.

In 1997 he played 18 games for the Brisbane club, scoring three tries. He also played at centre in his second consecutive grand final, this time a victory against the Cronulla-Sutherland Sharks in Brisbane.

In 1998 he returned to St. George.

Mundine was selected to play for New South Wales in each of the three matches of the 1999 State of Origin series, scoring a try in Game I on debut.

That year he also assisted St. George Illawarra's run to the Grand Final, with a hat-trick against the Cronulla-Sutherland Sharks in the major semi-final. The following week the club lost to the Melbourne Storm in the 1999 NRL Grand Final during which and Mundine, playing at five-eighth knocked-on over the try line early in the second half when the score was 14-0 in favour of St. George Illawarra, which proved to be a major turning point in the match.

The following year, Mundine said before the club's grand final rematch with Melbourne that Melbourne were not worthy premiers.  Melbourne would hand St. George Illawarra a 70-10 defeat at the Melbourne Cricket Ground.

Mundine was disappointed that further representative honours did not follow, and believed that his representative opportunities did not reflect his abilities and achievements at club level. He raised the issue of racism as the main explanation for this.

Mundine left rugby league halfway through the 2000 season, after being inspired to go into boxing, when a friend, Abdi Osman, showed him a video of Muhammad Ali. He later cited what he claimed was racism concerning rugby league as one of the reasons he quit to take up boxing. Mundine would later make implications during a promotion for a boxing match that former chairman of selectors and respected Aboriginal figure Arthur Beetson may have been an "Uncle Tom" who went along with the alleged racism.

In 2005 Mundine was reported to be making a comeback to the NRL, but this did not eventuate.

In 2007 Mundine was appointed Indigenous Liaison Officer at the South Sydney Rabbitohs.

Mundine has close family ties to rugby league: he is a relative of Wes Patten, Amos Roberts, Beau Mundine, Blake Ferguson and Reece Robinson, all NRL footballers. He is also the brother-in-law of Tyran Smith who married Mundine's sister, Kellie. Mundine's son CJ Mundine is currently on the path to playing in the NRL.

In September 2016, after stating on previous occasions he wanted to return to rugby league, Mundine claimed that St George chief executive Peter Doust had been in contact with him regarding his availability to play.  On 8 December 2017, Mundine again declared that he desired to return to rugby league and singled out St George as the club for which he wanted to play.  Mundine said in an interview with Fox Sports regarding his possible return that "It could be possible, you don’t know. Anything is possible with me,".

On 21 April 2019 it was announced that Mundine would make a return to rugby league and had signed with the Matraville Tigers in the South Sydney District Junior Rugby League.

Boxing career
Mundine is trained by his father, Tony Mundine, who was a middleweight contender during the 1970s.

Mundine fought his first professional boxing match in July 2000, at the age of 25. After a limited amateur career (he had 4 amateur fights when he was 17), his first professional fight was against New Zealander Gerrard Zohs. Only 10 professional bouts later Mundine fought for his first world title against long reigning IBF supermiddleweight champion Sven Ottke in January 2001.

Mundine vs. Sven Ottke

In 2001 Anthony Mundine took on then Super Middleweight champion Sven Ottke for the IBF Super Middleweight belt, Mundine was ahead on points before being knocked out by a right hand to the temple in the 10th round. This was the first time Mundine lost.

Mundine vs. Antwun Echols

Since the WBA and IBF super middleweight titles had been unified by Sven Ottke, Ottke was upgraded to "super" champion status by the WBA and the WBA "regular" super middleweight title was declared vacant (see undisputed champion). Mundine went on to claim the vacant WBA Super Middleweight title with a unanimous points decision over Antwun Echols on 3 September 2003, in front of his home crowd at the Sydney Entertainment Centre.

Mundine vs. Manny Siaca

After gaining the vacant WBA title and defending the title once, Mundine fought against Manny Siaca, In a hesitant performance Mundine lost in a 12-round split points decision.

Mundine vs. Mikkel Kessler

Mundine failed in his attempt to win the WBA super middleweight title after losing by decision to Mikkel Kessler on 6 August 2005 at the Sydney Entertainment Centre.

Mundine vs. Danny Green

Mundine's biggest Australian rivalry is with Perth-based Danny Green. In 2001, Mundine called Danny Green "a bum" in response to Green using Mundine's name to garner media attention, and stated that Danny would be a "no hoper" against him. Green waged a consistent media war with Mundine, using the media to build up his own name, and interest in a potential fight with Mundine.
The two boxers finally, after much anticipation, fought on 17 May 2006, at Aussie Stadium, Sydney. The bout was one of the most anticipated in Australian boxing history, and was thought to eclipse the attendance record of 37,000 when Jeff Fenech fought Azumah Nelson in their rematch in 1992. The fight was broadcast on Main Event helmed by Michael Schiavello. It was the biggest Pay Per View event in Australian television history. Green became the slight favourite about 2 hours before the bout. Green had little answer to Mundine's speed and jab, giving Mundine the upper hand. Mundine won a twelve-round unanimous decision by the following scores: Judge Michael Lee 116–113, Judge Pinij Prayadsub 118–111, Judge Derek Milham 118–112.

Mundine vs. Sam Soliman II

Soliman and Mundine would meet for a second time, this time competing for the vacant WBA "regular" super middleweight championship of the world. Unlike the first fight, Mundine dominated the proceedings, knocking his opponent down once in the second round, and three times in the ninth, prompting a knockout ruling by the referee.

Mundine vs. Daniel Geale

On 27 May 2009, Mundine faced then-undefeated International Boxing Organization middleweight champion Daniel Geale (21–0–0). Mundine won by split decision with two judges scoring it 116–113 and 114–113 in favour of Mundine, the third judge scoring 115–113 for Geale. After the fight, Mundine admitted that he had barely studied Geale prior to the fight. The fight undercard also marked the debut of Mundine's close friend and league-turned-rugby player Sonny Bill Williams.

Mundine vs. Garth Wood

On 8 December 2010 Mundine took on the winner of The Contender Australia boxing series, Garth Wood. After an awkward first four rounds, consisting of grappling, Mundine was on his way to a wide decision (being ahead 4–0 on the cards). Mundine was knocked out in the 5th round by Wood. Wood was able to land a flush left hook on Mundine's chin, sending him to the canvas. The result was reported to be one of the biggest upsets in Australian boxing history.

Mundine vs. Garth Wood II

On 13 April 2011 Mundine gained revenge for his loss when he defeated Wood in a rematch won every round and dropped him twice and won, via a 10-round unanimous points decision.

Mundine vs. Rigoberto Alvarez

On 19 October 2011 Mundine faced former WBA champion Rigoberto Alvarez for the interim WBA Light Middleweight world title. Mundine won by unanimous decision and as a result became the mandatory challenger for the full belt holder Austin Trout.

Mundine stripped of title

Trout was previously in negotiations with Mundine, but when Trout's management put additional options in the contract Mundine's team decided to force the fight through mandatory position enabling a more favourable negotiation. In March 2012 Mundine turned down the opportunity to face Trout.  The promotion of the fight went to a purse bid which Mundine did not pursue.  The WBA stripped Mundine of his title in May 2012 for failing to meet the obligations for the mandatory fight. Mundine signed a short-term deal with American promoter Cameron Dunkin.

Mundine vs. Bronco McKart

On 14 July 2012 Mundine faced American Bronco McKart. It was Mundine's first fight in the United States, with the stated aim being to eventually challenge undefeated champion Floyd Mayweather Jr. Mundine went on to win the bout by seventh-round TKO. McKart's loss was his first stoppage defeat since 2006, when he lost to Kelly Pavlik, and only his third TKO defeat in 65 fights.

Mundine vs. Daniel Geale II

On 30 January 2013, Mundine fought Daniel Geale for the second time, with Geale's IBF title on the line. The bout was the first time two Australians have fought for the IBF world middleweight title. The fight was sought by Mundine as a stepping-stone to his ultimate desire of fighting world champion Floyd Mayweather Jr., while Geale was seeking to avenge his only professional career loss – which was to Mundine in 2009. This was the biggest boxing event in Australia since Mundine fought Danny Green in 2006. Featured on the undercards were Kimbo Slice and Joel Brunker, among others. Mundine went on to lose the bout by unanimous points decision 112–116, 111–117 and 111–117. However, he refused to accept the result and immediately after ring announcer Jimmy Lennon Jr. read out the result, Mundine and his entourage stormed out of the ring and left the arena. Following Mundine's attack on the fight judges and their scoring, New South Wales Combat Sports Authority chairman Denis Fitzgerald is seeking legal advice to determine whether Mundine can be sued for his outburst.

Mundine vs. Shane Mosley

Mundine was to have fought American boxing legend Shane Mosley on 23 October 2013, at the Sydney Entertainment Centre; however, the fight was called off at the last minute by Shane Moseley, who demanded $1 million before entering the ring. Mundine had sent $300,000 of his own money, and his friend Jeff Fenech also put in 1/2 million upon Mosely's arrival to Australia, but this was short of the required $1 million. Mundine was keen to reschedule the fight and managed to raise the required $1 million appearance money with his manager, and the fight eventually took place on 27 November at Allphones Arena. The fight ended after round 6 with Shane Mosley retiring due to back spasms, giving Mundine the victory via TKO.

Mundine vs. Joshua Clottey

On 9 April 2014 Mundine fought former IBF welterweight champion Joshua Clottey in Newcastle and lost by unanimous decision.

Mundine vs. Sergey Rabchenko

On 12 November 2014, Mundine fought then-undefeated European champion Sergey Rabchenko at Hisense Arena, Melbourne. The sponsorship manager of the fight was suspected Melbourne underworld figure, Mick Gatto. The undercard featured former NRL player Cory Paterson. Mundine came into the fight a huge underdog after his defeat to Clottey. Mundine went on to win the fight in a split decision, with the three judges scoring the fight 115–113 and 116–112 for Mundine, and 113–115 for Rabchenko. This made Mundine the mandatory contender for Floyd Mayweather Jr.'s WBC light middleweight title.

Following Rabchenko, Mundine was due to fight Austin Trout in San Antonio, Texas on 9 May 2015; however, Mundine had to pull out after sustaining a perforated ear drum prior to the fight. Mundine was later replaced with Luis Galarza.

Business interests
Mundine has an extensive real estate portfolio and is also the owner of the sporting brand Boxa (est. 2000) and the Boxa Bar cafe in Hurstville. Early on the morning of 14 November 2013 the bar was destroyed by fire. 
Between 2000 and 2012 Mundine was managed by Khoder Nasser.

Music career
Mundine appeared in the music video of Angry Anderson's 1990 hit song "Bound for Glory". In 2001 Mundine appeared as himself in the music video "Like a Dog" by the Australian rock group Powderfinger, whose frontman Bernard Fanning praised Mundine as "the perfect lead, in terms of what the song is about and the fact that he's prepared to speak up for what he believes in." In 2005 he featured on beatboxer Joel Turner's single "Knock U Out". He then released his own debut single, "Platinum Ryder", which also featured Nathan Merritt and Amos Roberts in the music video. The film clip created controversy for the burning of the Union Jack and a photo of then Prime Minister of Australia John Howard. Mundine also appeared in the Brothablack music video, Are You With Me Out There, along with league player Joe Williams. In 2008 Mundine featured in the video of a GetUp Mob version of the song "From Little Things Big Things Grow". In 2009 Mundine also appeared alongside Shannon Noll on the Street Warriors' debut album, Unstoppable Force.

Charted singles

Other media
In July 2002, both Anthony and his father Tony appeared on an episode of Burke's Backyard with veteran Australian Gardening guru Don Burke.
Also in 2002 he appeared with other stars and celebrities in Celebrity Big Brother. In 2003 he was in an episode of Greeks on the Roof and in 2005 he appeared on Dancing with the Stars.
From 2007 to 2009 he appeared on The Footy Show. He was in a five-hour interactive DVD called Raising Children: A Guide to Parenting from Birth to Five. This DVD also featured Russell Crowe, Danielle Spencer, Neil Perry, Stan Grant and Johanna Griggs. He has also appeared in The Contender Australia three times. And been a guest, starring as himself, on the Pizza TV series. In 2010 Mundine was a Special Guest Trainer on The Biggest Loser Australia: Couples 2.

Mundine's portrait by James Hunt, entitled Bora Anthony Mundine, was a notable finalist in the 2002 Archibald Prize.

Mundine is featured as part of the roster on the Fight Night Round 4 and Fight Night Champion video games.

In October 2016 he appeared on Anh Do's Anh's Brush with Fame on the Australian Broadcasting Corporation.

In January 2018, Mundine was revealed as a celebrity contestant on the fourth season of the Australian version of I'm a Celebrity...Get Me Out of Here!. As of 8 February 2018, Anthony Mundine became the second celebrity to walk out on the 2018 series of I'm a Celebrity Get me out of here Australia following Bernard Tomic.

Recognition and awards
In June 2014, the annual Anthony Mundine Award for Courage was created as one of three awards at the newly-established National Indigenous Human Rights Awards in Sydney, New South Wales.

Indigenous Deadly Awards

|-
| 2007
| Indigenous Male Sportsperson of the Year
| Deadly Award Male Sportsperson of the Year
| 
|-
| 2006
| Indigenous Male Sportsperson of the Year
| Deadly Award Male Sportsperson of the Year
| 
|-
| 2003
| Indigenous Male Sportsperson of the Year
| Deadly Award Male Sportsperson of the Year
| 
|}

Public controversy
In an interview in October 2001, Mundine said of the 11 September terrorist attacks, "They call it an act of terrorism, but if you can understand religion, and our way of life, it’s not about terrorism. It’s about fighting for God’s law, and America’s brought it upon themselves". Offering some insight into his tendency to make controversial comments in the media, Mundine stated, "If you want to toe the line, if you want to be some corporate guy and say the right things, do the right things, you might be okay in the media's eye, but it won't be real for me". Mundine later claimed he was taken out of context: "Those comments were just spun around like I was clapping my hands. I have a family too, I know what it is like to suffer the loss of someone close to me, and I would never wish that upon anyone. The point I was trying to get across was that it was in a war state of mind, and there is always going to be tit for tat, so why put yourself in a situation where you can endanger people. I have got nothing against any American, I have got nothing against any human being. It breaks my heart that people think I would even have that line of thought about being happy about people dying. That is crap and I want to clarify that because it is wrong".

Mundine also referred to Cathy Freeman as a sellout: "Cathy Freeman. She sold out, toeing the line. And that ain't me. I'm not a fake." He also went on to state repeated times that men, not women, are more qualified to lead. "As far as being a leader, that's not her anyway, a man can only lead."

In late 2012, Mundine questioned former opponent WBA/IBF champion Daniel Geale's indigenous Tasmanian heritage by saying that he should not wear the Australian Aboriginal Flag on his shorts: "I thought they wiped all the Aborigines from Tasmania out.... He's got a white woman, he's got white kids. I keep it real, all day every day". When asked whether Geale deserved to sport the Aboriginal flag on his trunks, he said, "No". Mundine later apologised to the Tasmanian Aboriginal community and added that he felt many people claimed indigenous heritage to receive government benefits but had no real connection with their Aboriginal roots. He also claimed that Australia was one of "the most racist nations in the world" before calling for the Australian anthem and the Australian flag to be changed to be more inclusive of indigenous Australians.

In November 2013, Mundine, an Aboriginal Australian, made comments on Twitter stating that homosexuality was incompatible with Aboriginal beliefs. Following Mundine's comments, Aboriginal actor Luke Carroll pointed out that Mundine's own religious beliefs that led him to form his opinions on homosexuality were incompatible with the Aboriginal Dreamtime. On coming out in a 2015 interview with NITV, former NRL player Casey Conway described Mundine's comments as "really disappointing" and unrepresentative of the Aboriginal community, describing the damage that homophobic comments can do to young people.

Mundine is a strong opponent of lockdown measures in response to the COVID-19 pandemic. On 25 July, he attended a large anti-lockdown protest in Sydney breaching gathering laws, despite previously receiving two fines for breaking lockdown laws by flying from Sydney to Ballina without a reasonable excuse and refusing to wear a mask while shopping. He also opposes COVID-19 vaccination, writing on Facebook, “You take the shot then you will have serious health problems even death!”. Mundine considers the vaccine rollout to be an attempt to depopulate the Earth.

Professional boxing record

References

Further reading

External links

1975 births
Living people
Australian male boxers
Australian Muslims
Australian rugby league players
Big Brother (Australian TV series) contestants
Boxers from Sydney
Brisbane Broncos players
Bundjalung people
Converts to Islam
I'm a Celebrity...Get Me Out of Here! (Australian TV series) participants
Indigenous Australian boxers
Indigenous Australian rugby league players
International Boxing Organization champions
Light-middleweight boxers
Middleweight boxers
New South Wales City Origin rugby league team players
New South Wales Rugby League State of Origin players
People educated at Canterbury Boys' High School
People from the Inner West (Sydney)
St. George Dragons players
St. George Illawarra Dragons players
Rugby league centres
Rugby league five-eighths
Rugby league players from Sydney
World Boxing Association champions
World super-middleweight boxing champions